The Angola national handball team are the national handball team of Angola.

Results

World Championship

African Championship

Red border color indicates tournament was held on home :soil.

Current squad
Squad for the 2021 World Men's Handball Championship.

Head coach: José Adelino

References

External links
IHF profile

Men's national handball teams
Handball in Angola
National sports teams of Angola